= Indonesia and the International Monetary Fund =

The International Monetary Fund (IMF) has historically had a large presence in Indonesia, Southeast Asia's largest economy. During the Suharto era of the 1960s to 1990s the IMF enjoyed an active presence in the Indonesian economy and politics gaining influence through political sympathizers and technocrats within the Indonesian government. The early years of the Suharto era saw economic growth and modernization in a country that had only recently gained independence form Dutch colonialists. However, as the country modernized and growth slowed corruption became even more rampant particularly amongst the inner circle of the regime. After the fall of Suharto in 1998 the new elected government had a different approach to the IMF and was not so friendly towards restrictions on its economic decisions.

== Asian financial crises ==
The Asian Financial Crises that spread across Asia and in particular East and Southeast Asia was created by a heavy reliance on short-term foreign loans and openness to hot money. Asian governments were generally not running budget deficits and believed that the IMF would be reliable in the event of a bailout. Instead, the IMF failed to roll over short-term loans to long-term loans and forced governments including Indonesia to guarantee private debts owed to foreign creditors. Roughly US$110 billion in short-term loans were advanced to Indonesia, South Korea and Thailand to help them stabilize their economies. The IMF imposed conditionality requirement by increasing taxes and interests rates combined with cutting government spending resulted in most countries recovering by 1999.

The IMF arrived in Indonesia with a bailout package of US$43B demanding the closure of 16 privately owned banks and advised Indonesian Central Bank to raise interest rates. Early on the IMF realized their program was not going well and the managing director had used a previously planned visit to gain the attention of President Suharto in raising the interest rates but failed. This resulted in failure as the closure of the 16 banks triggered a run on in other banks. Billions of rupiah were withdrawn from saving accounts restricting these bank's abilities to lend forcing the Central Bank to provide large credits towards the remaining banks to avert a banking crises. Evidence is shown as in January 1998 the Indonesian rupiah lost half its value within 5 days. A second IMF agreement was drafted to include provisions of a social safety net designed to tackle Suharto's patronage system. This still failed resulting in a third agreement drafted in April 1998. It was more flexible, demanding privatization of state-owned companies and a new bankruptcy law and court to handle bankruptcy cases. The fourth and final agreement was signed in June 1998 after BJ Habibie stepped up following Suharto's downfall allowing the budget deficit to widen further whilst new funds were pumped into the economy. The Indonesian economy finally improved in 1999 due to an improving international environment which caused a rise in export revenues.

== Post-Suharto era ==
On January 21, 2003 the Indonesian govt declared that it was going to break free of IMF commitments. The Indonesian government expressed that they did not want to extend the existing US$4.8 billion loan package with the IMF. President Megawati Sukarnoputri had already raised prices of basic necessities such as fuel, electricity and telephone to meet the IMF program of cutting state subsidies and narrowing the budget deficit. Protests erupted and although the crisis was not predicted to be as bad as the one that had toppled Suharto in 1998 the newly formed democratic government had come to a crossroads between facing more protesters or backing out of IMF loans. The new democratic government was very concerned with shattering the fragile peace that was holding the nation after the riots of 1998. The end of the IMF agreement with Indonesia was also cemented by longstanding discontent between two parties with the Indonesian government believing that the IMF meddled too much in policy making. Poor implementation of structural adjustment policies also hurt the lower classes even more. Over-optimization of economic growth by the IMF and the inflexibility of its policies made it difficult for the Indonesian government to maintain subsidies at levels that correlate with failing income levels. As a result, the IMF's Extended Fund Facility of 1998-2003 was paid early in October 2006 during Susilo Bambang Yudhoyono's presidency. Under the original repayment expectation schedule, the final repayment of outstanding obligations would have taken place in December 2010.

== 2018: Bali Summit ==
In 2018 the national IMF summit was held in Bali, Indonesia where the IMF backed Indonesia's response to selloff in currency, saying higher interest rates and foreign exchange intervention were correct in reducing volatility.. During the summit, it was agreed that meaningful commitments had to be created between countries to restore a balanced trading relationship.
